The New Russians ( novye russkie) were a newly rich business class who made their fortune in the 1990s in post-Soviet Russia. It is perceived as a stereotypical caricature. According to the stereotype, "New Russians" achieved rapid wealth by using criminal methods during Russia's chaotic transition to a market economy.

Etymology 
The exact time and place, as well as the authorship of this expression, have not been fully established.

Some consider that the expression Новый Русский (lit. "New Russian") arose in the Russian-speaking sphere in the demonstrated English-language form of "New Russian", and was then calcified into the Russian-language form. Another sparse theory suggests the term appeared in foreign press, and then made its way into Russia. Supporters of this theory consider that the author of the expression was the American journalist Hedrick Smith who published two books about Russia: "The Russians" (1976) and "The New Russians" (1990).

There's also a theory that it's more of a pun, playing on the French words "nouveau riche" (i.e. new rich), having an absolutely similar meaning as the term "New Russian". It is worth recalling that during Russia's industrial revolution at the end of the 19th century, Russians also used a term that was similar in meaning and use - “fast rich man” - (Russian: скоробогач) a person who very suddenly became wealthy; perhaps an individual with low moral principles). 

In the documentary film With a hard-sign on the end (С твёрдом знаком на конце), dedicated to the 20th anniversary of the creation of the newspaper Kommersant (Коммерсантъ) and shown on Channel One on 30 November 2009), author Leonid Parfyonov demonstrates a copy of Kommersant from 1992 in which an editorial letter was addressed to the "New Russians". Parfyonov confirms that the newspaper first introduced this word into daily life, and at first it didn't have any negative or ironic connotation, merely serving to describe the representatives of Russia's growing business class.

In 2010, chief researcher at the Institute of Sociology of the Russian Academy of Sciences, Renald Simonyan noted that the “new Russians” were the product of the reforms of the 1990s, giving them the following characteristics: “Physically strong, poorly educated, assertive, devoid of moral values, and materialistic types”.

See also
Russian oligarch
NEPman 
New Soviet man
Novus homo
Russian Mafia
Oligarchy
Gopnik
Nouveau riche

References

Sources
Crimson Tide, appearing in the British newspaper The Sunday Times.

Caricature
Class discrimination
Ethnic and racial stereotypes
Social groups of Russia